Yevhen Hryhorovych Khacheridi (Evgenios Chatseridis; born 28 July 1987) is a Ukrainian footballer.

Club career

Dynamo Kyiv
In 2010 he moved to the senior club of Dynamo Kyiv. Here he won the Ukrainian Premier League in the 2008–09, 2014–15 and 2015–16. He also won the Ukrainian Cup in the season 2013–14, 2014–15 and the Ukrainian Super Cup in the season 2009, 2011 and 2016.

PAOK FC
In summer 2018 he moved to PAOK, in Greece. With the club of Thessaloniki, he won the Super League Greece in the season 2018–19 and the Greek Cup in the season 2018–19.

Dynamo Brest
Khacheridi signed a contract with Belarusian Premier League club Dynamo Brest in October 2019, effective from 1 January 2020 until the end of 2021. The 4 March 2020 he won Belarusian Super Cup.

Training with Desna Chernihiv
In summer 2021 he started be on training with Desna Chernihiv, the main city in Chernihiv in Ukrainian Premier League. The president of Desna Volodymyr Levin in an interview, confirmed this news and that the club was interested to sign the player. On 25 August 2021, Khacheredi left Desna training camp after spending about three weeks in the location of the Desna Chernihiv, with which he maintained training form, the parties did not come to a common denominator regarding the signing of the contract. Khacheridi left the training camp of Oleksandr Ryabokon's team on his own initiative. It is unknown whether the search for a new club will continue. These news were also confirmed to by the Desna, Sport Director Vadym Melnyk.

International career

He made his international debut for Ukraine against England on a 1–0 victory for Ukraine, in Dnipro Arena on 10 October 2009, playing as centre back. He also played in the last group-stage game against Andorra in Andorra La Vella, on a 6–0 Ukrainian victory.
Ukraine ended up 2nd in the group, behind England, so they played against his ancestral country Greece. The first game in Athens finished 0–0. However, Ukraine could not obtain a place on the 2010 World Cup final stage, because the second leg, played in Donbass Arena, ended in a 1–0 Greek victory, with a goal scored by Dimitris Salpingidis. Khacheridi was rostered for neither game, playing the full 90 minutes in both of them.

Khacheridi represented Ukraine at UEFA Euro 2012, having played all three games in Group Stage as a starter, though Ukraine was eliminated. His partners were his teammate Taras Mykhalyk and Yaroslav Rakitskiy.

Personal life
Khacheridi's father belongs to the community of Pontic Greeks settled in Ukraine since the Middle Ages, while his mother is Ukrainian. Khacheridi has graduated from Melitopol Bohdan Khmelnytsky Melitopol State Pedagogical University, where he was studying to be a physical education teacher.

Career statistics

Club

International goals
Scores and results list Ukraine's goal tally first.

Honours 
Dynamo Kyiv
Ukrainian Premier League (3): 2008–09, 2014–15, 2015–16
Ukrainian Cup (2): 2013–14, 2014–15
Ukrainian Super Cup (3): 2009, 2011, 2016

PAOK
Super League Greece (1): 2018–19
Greek Cup (1): 2018–19

Dynamo Brest
Belarusian Super Cup (1): 2020

References

External links

1987 births
Living people
Ukrainian footballers
Ukraine international footballers
SC Olkom Melitopol players
FC Metalurh-2 Zaporizhzhia players
FC Volyn Lutsk players
FC Dynamo Kyiv players
FC Dynamo-2 Kyiv players
Ukrainian Premier League players
Ukrainian First League players
Ukrainian Second League players
Super League Greece players
Belarusian Premier League players
Association football central defenders
Pontic Greeks
Ukrainian people of Greek descent
People from Melitopol
UEFA Euro 2012 players
UEFA Euro 2016 players
PAOK FC players
Expatriate footballers in Greece
Ukrainian expatriate footballers
Ukrainian expatriate sportspeople in Greece
FC Dynamo Brest players
Expatriate footballers in Belarus
Ukrainian expatriate sportspeople in Belarus
Sportspeople from Zaporizhzhia Oblast